Gulmarg Assembly constituency is one of the  constituencies in the Jammu and Kashmir Legislative Assembly of Jammu and Kashmir, a union territory of India. Gulmarg is also part of Baramulla Lok Sabha constituency.

Member of Legislative Assembly

Election results

References

Assembly constituencies of Jammu and Kashmir